γ-Terpinene synthase (EC 4.2.3.114, OvTPS2, ClcTS) is an enzyme with systematic name geranyl-diphosphate diphosphate-lyase (cyclizing, γ-terpinene-forming). This enzyme catalyses the following chemical reaction

 geranyl diphosphate  γ-terpinene + diphosphate

This enzyme is isolated from Thymus vulgaris (thyme), Citrus limon (lemon), Citrus unshiu (satsuma) and Origanum vulgare (oregano).

References

External links 
 

EC 4.2.3